Carlos M. García, (born on June 25, 1971, in Mayagüez, Puerto Rico), is a Puerto Rican banker, public servant, and private equity investor who served as president of the Puerto Rico Government Development Bank  (GDB) from 2009 to 2011 during the administration of Governor Luis Fortuño.

Appointed as president, CEO and Chairman of the Board of GDB on November 13, 2008 by Gov.-elect Fortuño, he had to assume responsibilities long before going on the payroll since they both had to travel to Wall Street, while still in transition, to buy time from the credit-rating agencies to avoid having the island's bonds reclassified into junk-bond status before the new administration had an opportunity to legislate new fiscal policy laws.

The 2009 legislation to handle the $3.306 billion operational and structural deficit that the new administration confronted upon taking office created a Fiscal Reconstruction and Stabilization Board (JREF) and the Governor appointed García as chairman of the new board that was tasked with designing and implementing the fiscal recuperation policies.  Over 22 months, government expenditures were reduced by 20% and Wall Street credit-rating agencies restored the islands' ratings to their highest levels in 35 years and used a newly enacted Public-Private Partnership Act, as well as the 2006 COFINA securitization mechanism to stabilize Puerto Rico's finances..

As head of the Governor's economic team, García coordinated simultaneously the disbursement of over $6.5 billion in American Recovery and Reinvestment Act of 2009 funds, lobbying and implementation of the federal health reform program that is injecting hundreds of millions of dollars in new federal dollars in Puerto Rico's health industry, and the rescue of Puerto Rico's banking system, including three Federal Deposit Insurance Corporation-assisted transactions that comprised 70% of Puerto Rico's banking market.

During his stint in the public sector, he also served as Chairman of the Board of the newly created Puerto Rico Public-Private Partnerships Authority, charged initially with five major public private initiatives, three of which injected over $3 billion in Puerto Rico's economy.

Prior to his stint in public life, Carlos García served as president and COO of Banco Santander Puerto Rico, one of the top banks in Puerto Rico, as well as member of the Board of Directors of Santander Bancorp (NYSE: SBP) from 2001 to 2008.  Until 2001, he served as president, CEO and Vice Chairman of the Board of Santander Securities Corporation, Puerto Rico's second largest wealth and asset management firm.  Before joining the Santander corporate family, he served as Vice President of Popular Securities, a subsidiary of Popular, Inc., and an analyst for  Credit Suisse First Boston in San Juan, Puerto Rico and New York, New York.

Carlos is currently the Managing Partner of the financial institutions focused private equity firm, BayBoston Capital.

Married with three children, García is an avid marathoner.

Education

A graduate of the University of Pennsylvania, García participation in a dual degree program made it possible to obtain a Bachelor of Science in Economics, majoring in Management, from the Wharton School, and a Bachelor of Arts and Sciences degree in Comparative Literature after completing an honors thesis on Federico García Lorca's "Sonetos del Amor Oscuro", published after the Spanish writer's death.

Honors and recognitions

Named "Public Sector Person of the Year" by Caribbean Business weekly business newspaper in 2009.

All Ivy league Academic Honors, University of Pennsylvania

UPenn's Men's Varsity Division, Tennis Team Captain and Julius Axelrod Sportsmanship Award

References

External links
 Government Development Bank for Puerto Rico Presidential Gallery

1971 births
Living people
People from Mayagüez, Puerto Rico
Presidents of the Puerto Rico Government Development Bank
Wharton School of the University of Pennsylvania alumni
University of Pennsylvania alumni